Amphientomidae is a family of Psocodea (formerly Psocoptera) belonging to the suborder Troctomorpha. The presence of scales on their wings gives them a superficial resemblance to the unrelated family Lepidopsocidae (within Trogiomorpha), and both families can pass for microlepidoptera to the untrained eye. The family comprises 100 species arranged in twenty genera.

References

Lienhard, C. & Smithers, C. N. 2002. Psocoptera (Insecta): World Catalogue and Bibliography. Instrumenta Biodiversitatis, vol. 5. Muséum d'histoire naturelle, Genève.

Psocoptera families
Troctomorpha